Gottlieb Emanuel von Haller (1735–1786) was a Bernese historian, numismatist, botanist, politician, diplomat and librarian.

Biography
He was the eldest son of polymath Albrecht von Haller. Born in Berne, he studied law and history in Göttingen, where his father was professor for medicine and botany. 
He returned to Berne in 1753. He entered public service in Berne, in 1763 as vice-librarian, 1765 as secretary of the war council, and from 1775 as member of the city council. He was a fellow of the Academy of Sciences Leopoldina from 1778. He was sent to represent Berne in the transmontane bailiwicks in 1779/80 and from 1785 until his death he served as reeve of Nyon.

He married Anna Margarethe Schultheß (1734–1810) in 1761, with whom he had six sons and four daughters. One of his sons was political philosopher Karl Ludwig von Haller.

Works
As a student, he wrote pamphlets against the Linnean system of taxonomy.
During his career he authored numerous works on bibliothecography, numismatics and the history of Switzerland, writing in German, French and Latin.
His magnum opus was a History of Switzerland (Bibliothek der Schweizer-Geschichte) in six volumes, two volumes published during his lifetime, the remaining four, which were ready for print at the time of his death, were published posthumously by J.J. Stapfer.

Epistola ad patrem, dubia ex Linnaei fundamentis botanicis hausta continens, Göttingen, 1750
Dubiorum contra sect. VII. Fundam. bot. Linnaei, Göttingen, 1753
Specimen bibliothecae Helveticae, Bern, 1757
Conseils pour former une Bibliothèque historique de la Suisse, Bern, 1771
Wilhelm Tell – Eine Vorlesung, Bern, 1772
Schweitzerisches Münz- und Medaillenkabinett, Bern, 1781/82
Bibliothek der Schweizer-Geschichte und aller Theile, so dahin Bezug haben, Bern, 1785–1787 (doi:10.3931/e-rara-24952)

See also
Historiography of Switzerland

References

Emil Blösch: "Haller, Gottlieb von", Allgemeine Deutsche Biographie vol. 10, (1879), 430f.
Hans Haeberli: "Haller, Gottlieb Emanuel von", Neue Deutsche Biographie vol. 7 (1966), 548f.

18th-century Swiss historians
Swiss numismatists
People from Bern
1735 births
1786 deaths